Jimmy Smith Trio + LD is an album by jazz organist Jimmy Smith and saxophonist Lou Donaldson recorded for the Blue Note label in 1957 and released only in Japan.

Reception
The album was awarded 2½ stars by Stephen Thomas Erlewine in an Allmusic review which stated:

Track listing
 "Soft Winds" (Benny Goodman) – 7:58
 "Hollerin' and Screamin'" (Eddie Davis) – 6:59
 "'Round Midnight" (Thelonious Monk) – 6:27
 "Star Eyes" (Gene DePaul, Don Raye) – 4:59
 "Darn That Dream" (Eddie DeLange, Jimmy Van Heusen) – 6:41
 "Street of Dreams" (Sam M. Lewis, Victor Young) – 5:12
 "Cha Cha J" (Jimmy Smith, Lou Donaldson) – 4:18

Personnel

Musicians
 Jimmy Smith – organ
 Lou Donaldson – alto saxophone, (tracks 1–2, 4, 6) 
 Eddie McFadden – guitar
 Donald Bailey – drums

Technical
 Alfred Lion – producer
 Rudy Van Gelder – engineer
 Bob Porter – liner notes

References

Jimmy Smith (musician) albums
Lou Donaldson albums
1957 albums
Blue Note Records albums
Albums produced by Alfred Lion